The Eastern Counties Football League, currently known as the Thurlow Nunn League for sponsorship purposes, is an English football league at levels 9 and 10 of the English football league system. It currently contains clubs from Norfolk, Suffolk, Essex, eastern Cambridgeshire, eastern Hertfordshire, southern Lincolnshire, and north and east London. The league is a feeder to Division One North of the Isthmian League.

History

Formation
During the early part of the 20th century there were several leagues covering East Anglia, including the Norfolk & Suffolk League, the East Anglian League, the Essex & Suffolk Border League and the Ipswich & District League, whilst some of the larger clubs (including Ipswich Town and Cambridge Town) played in the Southern Amateur League. Suggestions of forming a league to cover the whole region had been made since the early 1900s, but intensified after Norwich City were promoted to Division Two of the Football League in 1934 and saw a significant rise in attendances. During the 1934–35 season there was a strong movement in Harwich and Ipswich for the formation of such a league and after canvassing, a 'Meeting of Representatives of East Anglian Football Clubs' was held at the Picture House in Ipswich on 17 February 1935. The ten clubs in attendance were Cambridge Town, Harwich & Parkeston and Ipswich Town from the SAL, Colchester Town and Crittall Athletic from the Spartan League, and Gorleston, Great Yarmouth Town, King's Lynn, Lowestoft Town and Norwich CEYMS from the Norfolk & Suffolk League. Although Cambridge Town and Norwich CEYMS later decided against joining, a further four clubs were recruited: Bury Town and Thetford Town from the Norfolk & Suffolk League, Chelmsford City from the London League and Clacton Town from the Ipswich & District League.

Early years
The first season commenced on 31 August 1935 and ended with Harwich and Lowestoft level at the top of the league with 26 points each. Although Lowestoft had a better goal average, the championship was decided by a play-off match held at Layer Road on 29 August 1936. The match ended in a 3–3 draw and the two were declared joint champions and allowed to hold the trophy for six months each. At the end of the first season Ipswich left to join the Southern League and were replaced by their reserve team.

At the end of the 1936–37 season there were concerns about the league's viability. All five Essex clubs had left to join the newly established Essex County League, whilst Thetford had resigned after finishing bottom of the league, leaving only six remaining clubs. However, four new members (Colchester United reserves, Cromer, Newmarket Town and Norwich CEYMS) were recruited. The following season the league expanded to 13 clubs as two of the Essex clubs rejoined (the Essex County League had been a failure with only five members completing the season and was not continued).

The 1939–40 season started on 26 August, but was abandoned after the outbreak of World War II. After the war ended in May 1945 a meeting was held in late June to see whether the league could be restarted. However, a further meeting on 28 July decided that too few clubs were ready to resume footballing activities as many were unable to sign players and some grounds remained under the control of the armed forces. The league finally resumed for the 1946–47 season with ten clubs.

Later development
Prior to the start of the 1948–49 season the league was expanded to 16 clubs, largely through the addition of the 'A' teams of four London clubs, Arsenal, Chelsea, Tottenham Hotspur and West Ham United. The following season Gillingham reserves joined, becoming the only Kent-based club to ever play in the league (Dartford also applied to join at the same time, but were rejected). In 1951 the league gained its first Cambridgeshire club with the admission of Cambridge United, and by 1955–56 the league was up to 20 clubs, of which five were reserve or 'A' teams. Although a succession of clubs leaving the league saw it reduced to fourteen clubs by 1964, it quickly regained numbers and was back up to 18 members two years later. In 1976 the league was renamed the Eastern League, but returned to its original name six years later. The league was among the first to be sponsored by an external company when, in the late 1970s, it was sponsored by local building societies Magnet and Planet, and Town and Country. More recently it has been sponsored by building supplies company Jewson, Ridgeons, and current sponsor Thurlow Nunn.

Expansion to two divisions
There had been occasional discussions about adding a second division to the league since its formation, but in 1983 it seemed about to become a reality. However, it was then delayed by the Football Association at the request of the Essex Senior League. The idea was resurrected during the 1987–88 season and a meeting was held to discuss it on 22 November 1987. The league contacted 21 clubs who were considered potential members, of which fifteen were interested in joining. A further four clubs were contacted and another (Long Sutton Athletic) asked for details. Ultimately fourteen clubs applied to join the league; eight from the Peterborough & District League (Downham Town, Huntingdon United, King's Lynn reserves, Ortonians, Somersham Town, Warboys Town and Yaxley – Parson Drove also applied later in the year, but were rejected), three from the Anglian Combination (Diss Town, Fakenham Town and Wroxham) and three from the Essex & Suffolk Border League (Bury Town reserves, Hatfield Peverel and Little Oakley). All were accepted except Hatfield Peveral and Little Oakley, whose grounds were deemed inadequate, whilst Ortonians later withdrew after difficulties getting their reserve and 'A' teams into the Peterborough & District League. Mildenhall Town from the Cambridgeshire League and Ipswich Wanderers from the Ipswich Sunday League were later invited to join, whilst Halstead Town were persuaded to transfer from the Essex Senior League after Ortonian's late withdrawal, allowing the inaugural Division One season in 1988–89 to start with 14 clubs.

Addition of Division One South
On 3 October 2017, The Football Association ratified the creation of a new Step 6 (level 10) division in the league, Division One South, which started playing in the 2018–19 season. It covers the rest of Essex, as well as East London and parts of North London and east Hertfordshire and is intended to enable promotion to the Essex Senior League and relegation to the Essex Olympian League.

Current members (2022–23)

Former teams
Ninety teams have previously played in the Eastern Counties League, including several reserve and 'A' teams. The league's geographical span has previously stretched from Gillingham in Kent in the south to Boston in Lincolnshire in the north and Eynesbury in Cambridgeshire in the west. In the 1940s and 1950s it contained up to four 'A' teams from London.

A.F.C. Sudbury (1999–2006)
Arsenal 'A' (1948–55)
Biggleswade Town (1955–63)
Boston Town (1966–68)
Braintree Town (four spells)
Braintree Town Reserves (2012–19)
Brightlingsea Regent (2011–14)
Brightlingsea Regent Reserves (2018–20)
Brightlingsea United (1990–2002)
Brimsdown (2020–22)
Buckhurst Hill (2021–22)
Bungay Town (1963–64)
Bury Town (three spells)
Bury Town Reserves (1988–96)
Cambridge City Reserves (six spells)
Cambridge Regional College (2006–14)
Cambridge United (1951–58)
Cambridge United Reserves (1959–60, 1978–79)
Cambridge University Press (2010–13)
Chatteris Town (1966–2001)
Chelmsford (1935–37)
Chelmsford City Reserves (1938–63)
Chelsea Reserves (1948–53)
Clacton Town/FC Clacton (four spells)
Coggeshall Town (2016–18)
Colchester Town (1935–37)
Colchester United Reserves (1937–59, 1976–88)
Cromer (1937–39)
Dereham Town (1998–2013)
Dereham Town Reserves (2013–17)
Eynesbury Rovers (1952–63)

Felixstowe Port & Town (1976–2000)
Felixstowe & Walton United (2000–18)
Felixstowe & Walton United Reserves (2018–20)
Fire United (2018–20)
Fulbourn Institute (2005–06)
Gillingham Reserves (1949–54)
Godmanchester Rovers (2002–21)
Gorleston (three spells)
Gothic (1963–78)
Halstead Town (1988–2022)
Hashtag United (2018–19)
Hertford Town (1972–73)
Histon (1965–2000, 2017–19)
Histon reserves (2000–11)
Holbeach United (1955–62)
Huntingdon United (1988–92)
Ipswich Town (1935–36)
Ipswich Town Reserves (1936–38)
Ipswich Town 'A' (1948–51)
King's Lynn (1935–39, 1948–54)
King's Lynn Reserves (four spells)
King's Lynn Town Reserves (2014–21)
Leiston (2001–11)
Leyton Athletic (2019–20)
Little Oakley (2017–21)
Long Sutton Athletic (1988–95)
Lopes Tavares/Athletic Newham (2018–21)
Lowestoft Town (1935–2009)
Maldon Town (1966–72, 1996–2004)
March Town United (1954–2022)

Needham Market (1996–2010)
Norwich CEYMS (1937–39)
Norwich City Reserves (1946–48)
Norwich City 'A' (1949–58, 1963–75)
Norwich United Reserves (2017–2018)
Peterborough North End Sports (2021–22)
Peterborough United Reserves (1954–60, 1972–73)
Romford Reserves (1959–63)
Saffron Walden Town (three spells)
Somersham Town (1988–2004)
Southend United 'A' (1961–62)
Spalding United (1955–60)
St Neots Town (1969–73)
Stanway Rovers (1992–2018, 2019–21)
Stowmarket/Stowmarket Town (1952–2021)
Sudbury Town (1955–90, 1997–99)
Sudbury Town Reserves (1990–97)
Sudbury Wanderers (1991–99)
Team Bury (2009–18)
Tiptree United (1979–2009)
Tottenham Hotspur 'A' (1948–63)
University of East Anglia (2021–22)
Warboys Town (1988–2004)
Watton United (1986–2000)
West Ham United 'A' (1948–56)
White Ensign (2018–21)
Wisbech St Mary (2016–22)
Wisbech Town (three spells)
Wroxham (1989–2012, 2017–22)
Yaxley (1988–92)

Notes

Membership rejected
Between its inception in 1935 and the formalisation of promotion and relegation between the ECL and its feeder leagues in 1983, several clubs applied to join the Eastern Counties League but were rejected, or were approached by the league but turned the offer of admission down. These included:

Applied to the league but were rejected
Chingford Town (1948)
Dagenham (1949)
Dagenham Town (1950)
Dartford (1949)
Exning Town (1959)
Hoddesdon Town (1974)
Hoffman Athletic (1938)
Letchworth (1953)
RAFFC (1937)
Rushden Town (1954)
Queens Park Rangers 'A' (1948)
Sheringham (1937)
Stevenage Athletic (1974)
Tunbridge Wells (1954)

Approached by the league but declined
Brentford 'A' (1947, 1948)
Charlton Athletic 'A', (1948)
Fulham 'A' (1948)
Leyton Orient 'A' (1947)

Champions
The champions of the league have been as follows:

Records

Clubs
Longest membership: Great Yarmouth Town – 1935 (founder members) to date
Highest attendance: 8,387 for King's Lynn vs Wisbech Town, 12 September 1951

Matches
Fewest defeats in a season: Chelmsford City reserves – undefeated in 1946–47
Most wins in a season
Wroxham – 34 in 44 matches in 1996–97
Chelmsford City reserves – 16 in 18 matches in 1946–47 (89% victory rate)
Fewest wins in a season: None by Thetford Town (1936–37), Newmarket Town (1951–52), Eynesbury Rovers (1960–61), Chatteris Town (1989–90), Clacton Town (2005–06)
Most defeats in a season
Newmarket Town – lost all 34 matches in 1951–52
Clacton Town – lost 41 of 42 matches in 2005–06
Most draws in a season: Watton United – drew 19 of 40 matches in 1989–90
Biggest win: Lowestoft Town 19–0 Thetford Town, 20 March 1937
Biggest away win: Newmarket Town 0–12 Biggleswade Town, 2 December 1961
Most consecutive wins: 19 by Lowestoft Town between 21 October 1967 and 13 April 1968
Most wins from the start of a season: 18 by Bury Town in 1963–64
Longest unbeaten run: 37 matches by Wisbech Town between 30 April 1983 and 20 April 1984
Longest unbeaten start to a season: 34 matches by Wisbech Town in 1983–84
Most consecutive defeats: 39 by Newmarket Town between 1951 and 1959 (they left the league in 1952 and returned in 1959)
Most matches without a win: 45 by Newmarket Town between 1951 and 1959

Goals
Most goals in a season
Lowestoft Town scored 157 in 34 matches in 1966–67 (4.62 a game)
Chelmsford City reserves scored 95 in 18 matches in 1946–47 (5.28 a game)
Fewest goals conceded in a season: Norwich United – 19 in 36 matches (1990–91)
Fewest goals scored in a season
Thetford Town – 18 in 19 matches (1936–37), Haverhill Rovers – 18 in 36 matches (1975–76), March Town United – 18 in 32 matches (2000–01), Warboys Town – 18 in 36 matches (2002–03)
Clacton Town – 20 in 42 matches in 2005–06
Most goals conceded: Chatteris Town – 208 in 40 matches in 1989–90
Most goals in a season: 57 in 30 matches by Mick Tooley (Lowestoft Town) in 1965–66
Most goals in a game: 9 by Ivan Thacker for Lowestoft Town in a 16–0 win over Bury Town on 28 December 1935
Most consecutive matches scored in: 18 by Mick Tooley (Lowestoft Town) during 1965–66

References

External links
Official website

 
1935 establishments in England
9
Sports leagues established in 1935